Municipal elections were held in Costa Rica on 7 February 2016, in order to elect the mayors of the 81 cantons of the country plus a proportional number of aldermen (regidores) in each of the canton's municipal councils, a syndic for every district and members of the District Councils and a total of 8 Intendants for districts and islands located too far away from the administrative center.

For the first time in history, election of aldermen was held at the same time as the other municipal offices. Until 2010 councilors were elected at the same time as the President and deputies in the general elections but a reform in the Electoral Law made all municipal offices elected at the same time and in the middle of the presidential period. Also, because of this change in the legislation, the previous election was held for a one-time only 6 years period.

Oppositional National Liberation Party earned most of the votes achieving majority in all offices including 50 mayors and 186 councilors, even though it suffer a noticeable decrease both in votes and offices obtained, including the loss of two provincial capitals; Limon city and San José city, both of them previously in hands of PLN's members that were expel from the party for ethical questionings and were nominated by local parties, among them former presidential nominee Johnny Araya. Social Christian Unity Party was recorded as the real winner as it increase its number of mayors passing from 9 to 15.

Ruling Citizens' Action Party was unable to take advantage of its position as government and only achieve one more mayor than previously. In several cantons the party went in alliance with local forces and the Broad Front.

Two new parties succeed in having new mayors; New Generation Party was a particular surprise as the party was the fourth in number of mayors winning in 3 cantons even though the party does not have parliamentary representation and received very few votes in the presidential ballot. While former president Rafael Ángel Calderón Fournier’s new Social Christian Republican Party won Vazquez de Coronado. Leftist Broad Front took part in the elections mostly in alliance with PAC and local forces winning in Montes de Oca and Acosta in that way and in one, Barva, completely alone. Local parties 21st Century Curridabat and Escazu's Progressive Yoke also won in Curridabat and Escazu respectively.

Results

See also 
 Local government in Costa Rica
 List of mayors in Costa Rica

References

2016 elections in Central America
2016 in Costa Rica
Local elections in Costa Rica